Belli Moda is a 1967 Kannada-language film directed by Puttanna Kanagal. It was based on the novel of same name by Triveni. Kanagal remade the movie in Malayalam in 1967 as Swapnabhoomi and in Telugu in 1968 as Palamanasulu. This was the first Kannada movie to be shot completely outdoors.

Plot
Indira (played by Kalpana) is the heiress of her father's estate, named "Belli Moda". A young man, Mohan (Kalyan Kumar) visits the estate to meet Indira's father (K. S. Ashwath) and petition for a financial scholarship from their club for his higher studies in the United States. Mohan discovers he has visited Belli Moda too late and that the scholarships have already been given out that year. It is suggested that he should try and apply next year, however Indira's mother (Pandari Bai) has other ideas. She is impressed by the Mohan's good looks and qualifications, and suggest to her husband that they should arrange for Mohan and Indira to be married. Mohan and his family are initially reluctant, but eventually agree to the arrangement after knowing that Indira is the only daughter so all of her father's estate will eventually pass to them. Mohan is provided with a scholarship for his education in the USA upon accepting the arrangement. Mohan leaves for the US after becoming engaged to Indira, promising to marry on his return. While he is abroad, Indira's mother unexpectedly gives birth to a boy. She dies due to complications of pregnancy at an advanced maternal age.

Mohan returns from the US after his studies to discover that his fiancée's mother has died in labour, leaving behind a son - the new inheritor of Belli Moda. This shatters Mohan's dreams of owning the estate and he refuses to marry Indira. When Indira questions him about his refusal to marry, she is shocked to discover that Mohan's only interest was in he father's property and that there was no love towards her. When leaving Bella Moda after this confrontation with Indira, Mohan falls from the hill and fractures his leg. A doctor advises him to rest uninterrupted until his leg heals, meaning he must at the estate and be taken care of by Indira and her family. During recovery, Mohan is surprised by the hospitality and love offered to him by the family, and is particularly taken by the Indira's kindness. He struggles to understand why he is taken care of so well despite his treachery. He realises that he made a mistake by rejecting a woman of such good character, and that Indira's love is more valuable than simple wealth. Mohan expresses remorse and wants to marry Indira, however she tells him that the innocence of pure love cannot be replaced once it is lost. Indira refuses to marry him, dismissing his proposal by saying "Belli karegithu Moda chadurithu" (The silver lining is gone, the clouds are scattered).

Cast
 Kalyan Kumar as Mohan Rao
 Kalpana as Indira
 K. S. Ashwath as Sadashivaiah
 Pandari Bai as Lalithamma
 Balakrishna as Puttaiah
 B. Jaya as Savithri
 Dwarakish as Paapaiah "Paapi"

Reception

Belli Moda was Kanagal's directorial debut. Actress Kalpana later came to be known as "Minugu Thare" (The Twinkling Star) owing to a reference in the title song of this film. Her residence in Bangalore was also called 'Belli Moda', as a tribute to the film. This film was screened at IFFI 1992 Kannada Cinema Retrospect.

Award
Karnataka State Film Awards 1967-68
 Second Best Film
 Best Actress – Kalpana
 Best Supporting Actress – Pandaribai 
 Best Music Director – Vijaya Bhaskar 
 Best Screenplay – S R Puttanna Kanagal 
 Best Cinematographer – R N K Prasad 
 Best Editing – V P Krishnan

Soundtrack

References

External links 
 

1967 films
1960s Kannada-language films
Films based on Indian novels
Films directed by Puttanna Kanagal
Films scored by Vijaya Bhaskar
Kannada literature
Kannada films remade in other languages